Rajat ("Raj") Parr is an Indian-American sommelier turned winemaker, who oversaw the wine program of the Michael Mina restaurant group before starting his own wineries in Oregon and the Central Coast of California. Sandhi is his label of purchased grapes while Lompoc, Domaine de la Cote, and Evening Land all are productions from his and Sashi Moorman's (his business partner) vineyards. He produces Pinot Noir and Chardonnay mainly, biodynamically and organically. His winemaking philosophy is based on little to no manipulation of the final product by never inoculating nor over-ripening.

Early life and education 
Parr was born and raised in Calcutta, India. He grew up close to his cousin, who ran two restaurants in New Delhi. Although he had read about wine, he had never tasted it (wine production and consumption in India is relatively limited) until age 20, in 1993, with an uncle living in London.

Parr graduated from the Welcomgroup Graduate School of Hotel Administration in Manipal, Karnataka, India. He graduated from the Culinary Institute of America in Hyde Park, New York, intending to become a chef and externed at the Raffles Hotel in Singapore.

Career 
Parr moved to San Francisco to become a food runner at Rubicon Restaurant, on encouragement from his wine instructor, after reading a magazine article about the restaurant's celebrity-sommelier Larry Stone. Parr, who visited vineyards on his days off to learn more about wine, impressed Stone with his persistence and determination. Within six months he became assistant to Stone, who became his mentor. After three years, Parr became sommelier of the Fifth Floor in San Francisco in 1999. In 2003 Parr was appointed wine director all of the Michael Mina restaurants throughout the United States.

In 2007 he, along with Michael Mina, were hired to develop and run a food and wine program by the developers of San Francisco's Millennium Tower, who called him "one of the most celebrated sommeliers in the world". The restaurant, RN74, had a $4.5 million budget and opened in May 2009 with an 84-page wine list. RN74 closed in October 2017.

In October 2010, Parr in collaboration with Jordan Mackay published Secrets of the Sommeliers, which won the 2011 James Beard Cookbook Award - Beverage Category. Parr and Mackay later co-authored The Sommelier's Atlas of Taste: A Field Guide to the Great Wines of Europe, released in October 2018.

See also 
 List of wine personalities

References 

Year of birth missing (living people)
Living people
Cuisine of the San Francisco Bay Area
Sommeliers
Culinary Institute of America Hyde Park alumni
Indian emigrants to the United States
Manipal Academy of Higher Education alumni
American people of Indian descent
American businesspeople